Dimitrie Mincu (russian Дмитрий Кириллович Минков; Bulgarian Димитър Кирилов Минков) was a Bessarabian politician, who was the Mayor of Chișinău in 1849—1854 and then in 1858–1860 and in 1861–1866.

Biography 
The father of Dimitrie Mincu (Minkov), Chiril (Кирилл), also known as Kalceo (Калчо), was a well-known Bulgarian merchant from Chișinău, who came to Bessarabia from Kalofer. He donated big   money for the construction of the cathedral.

Dimitrie Mincu became a judge in 1846, and between 1849 and 1854 led Chișinău in his first term. Before being re-elected as mayor in 1858, between 1854 and 1858 Chișinău's mayor was Anghel Nicolau, who was married to Dimitrie Mincu's sister.

The  Mincu's governing  is associated with the development of urban trade, active improvement of the city. Thanks to him, cobblestone streets appeared in the city. In his honor,  one of the paved streets of Chișinău, by the beginning of the World War II was called Minkowska (now George Coșbuc Street).

In 1848, Adam Krijanovski took the place of Dimitrie Mincu.

References 

Mayors of Chișinău
19th-century European people
Bessarabian Bulgarians